Derek Richard Payne (born 26 April 1967) is an English former professional footballer who played as a midfielder, making over 200 appearances in the Football League.

Career
Born in Edgware, Payne played for Kingsbury Town, Burnham, Hayes, Barnet, Cheltenham Town, Fisher Athletic, Southend United, Watford, Peterborough United, Dagenham & Redbridge, Harrow Borough, St Albans City, Egham Town and Flackwell Heath.

Since the mid-2000s, he has worked as a match-day summariser on BBC Three Counties Radio commentaries of Watford games.

Honours
Individual
PFA Team of the Year: 1992–93 Third Division

References

1967 births
Living people
English footballers
Kingsbury Town F.C. players
Burnham F.C. players
Hayes F.C. players
Barnet F.C. players
Cheltenham Town F.C. players
Fisher Athletic F.C. players
Southend United F.C. players
Watford F.C. players
Peterborough United F.C. players
Dagenham & Redbridge F.C. players
Harrow Borough F.C. players
St Albans City F.C. players
Egham Town F.C. players
Flackwell Heath F.C. players
English Football League players
Association football midfielders